South Georgia Medical Center is one of two hospital providers in Valdosta, Georgia and surrounding Lowndes County, Georgia. The facility opened in 1955 on Alternate Georgia State Route 7 (N Patterson St) north of downtown Valdosta. The hospital has 288 inpatient beds and is locally operated.

References

Hospital buildings completed in 1955
Hospitals in Georgia (U.S. state)
Buildings and structures in Lowndes County, Georgia
1955 establishments in Georgia (U.S. state)